The West African Senior School Certificate Examination (WASSCE) is a type of standardized test in West Africa. Students who pass the exam receive a certificate confirming their graduation from secondary education. It is administered by the West African Examinations Council (WAEC). It is only offered to candidates residing in Anglophone West African countries. The academic school-leaving qualification awarded upon successful completion of the exams is the West African Senior School Certificate.

The WASSCE tests four core subjects—English, mathematics, integrated science, social studies, and three or four elective subjects.

The Examinations
There are two types of WASSCE examinations:

WASSCE for School Candidates (May/June) is the Senior School Certificate Examination (SSCE) for school candidates. It is taken by final year students in senior secondary schools. They wear their respective school uniforms. This examination is offered during the summer (April to May), and the results are available by August.

WASSCE for Private Candidates (Jan/Feb and Nov/Dec), also known as General Certificate Examination (GCE) or WAEC GCE, is a private examination and uniforms are not required, but biometric registration is compulsory as in the former. This examination is offered during early spring (known as the first series) or autumn (known as the second series), and it is usually taken by secondary school leavers who want to correct deficiencies in their results. The results are available by March or December, usually 45 days after the last paper has been written.

Under the WAEC Marking and Grading Scheme, the letters A to F are used to indicate how good a result is (while the numbers 1-9 are only used to rank the grades). In other words, To get an A1 in a subject, WASSCE Mathematics for example, you need to score at least 75%. Doing so would mean you were able to get 75 questions correctly out of 100.

Below is the breakdown of the grading system, and the points used by Nigerian universities in screening prospective first-year undergraduate students as of 2021. 

It can be deduced from this table that the least obtainable passing grade is a C6 (regardless of the remarks). Candidates with a D7 and lower (especially in Mathematics and English language) are advised to retake the exam if they wish to pursue tertiary education in a degree-granting institution.

Official Guidelines For University Admission
Candidates are advised that they will be required to satisfy not only the university's general entrance requirements but also the requirements of the particular faculty which they wish to enter and that these requirements vary considerably. Particulars of entrance requirements and exemption regulations may be obtained from the universities or professional bodies concerned.

Nigeria
Nigerian senior secondary school students can take either the WASSCE or the National Examination Council (NECO) exam. 

Students who choose to study in Nigerian universities are required to sit the Unified Tertiary Matriculation Examination (UTME), an entrance examination administered by the state-owned Joint Admissions and Matriculation Board (JAMB).

United Kingdom
Universities in the United Kingdom may require candidates who did not obtain a credit in Maths and English to complete a one-year foundation course or acceptable alternative. WASSCE and GCE is the NARIC equivalent of GCSE and A-Levels respectively.

Germany
Universities in Germany can matriculate students, if there are five independent subjects in the West African Senior School Certificate Examination with at least the grade "credit". One of these five subjects must be maths or science. Additionally two languages must be among the five subjects, if humanities is the intended field of study at the German university. If the intended subject at the German university is outside the humanities, one language is sufficient among the five subjects graded with at least "credit".

References

Standardized tests
Secondary school qualifications